Aeshna persephone,  Persephone's darner,  is a species of dragonfly in the family Aeshnidae. It is found in northern Mexico and the southwestern United States. Its natural habitats are rivers and intermittent rivers.

References

Aeshnidae
Insects described in 1961
Taxonomy articles created by Polbot